Ko Matsushita (松下 耕, born 16 October 1962) is a Japanese conductor and composer.

Ko Matsushita was born and raised in Tokyo. He studied composition in the Kunitachi College of Music and chorus conducting in the Kodály Institute in Kecskemét, Hungary. He conducts in 2009 10 choir groups, and has won international Choir prizes with some of them.

Works 

 狩俣ぬくいちゃ (Karimatanu Kuicha)
 O lux beata Trinitas (for mixed choir)
"Tanpopo" (ja), song to lyrics by (ja) Hourai Taizou

References 

Official website

1962 births
21st-century classical composers
21st-century conductors (music)
21st-century Japanese composers
21st-century Japanese male musicians
Japanese classical composers
Japanese conductors (music)
Japanese male classical composers
Living people